Mohamed Bu Sakher (born July 15, 1968) is a Kuwaiti judoka. He represented Kuwait at the 1996 Summer Olympics, set to compete in Men's 95 kg category. He was defeated in one of the first rounds by Semir Pepic. He also took part in the 1995 and 1997 World Judo Championships, where he did not win any medals.

References

1968 births
Judoka at the 1996 Summer Olympics
Olympic judoka of Kuwait
Kuwaiti male judoka
Living people